Life Is Cheap... But Toilet Paper Is Expensive is a 1989 film directed by Wayne Wang. The film stars Cheng Wan Kin and John Chan. It won an award at the 1990 Rotterdam International Film Festival.

Plot summary
A man is hired, by people he believes to be gangsters, to deliver a briefcase from America to Hong Kong.

Cast
Lo Wai as The Big Boss, Mr Lo
Cora Miao as Money
Bonnie Ngai as Ying Ying (The Daughter)
John Chan as The Anthropologist (The Son In Law)
Cheng Wan Kin as Duck Killer
Kwan-Min Cheng as Uncle Cheng
Allen Fong as Taxi Driver
Rocky Wing Cheung Ho as Punk #2
Angela Yu Chien as Blue Velvet

Reception
The film was the subject of controversy when it originally received an X rating from the Motion Picture Association of America, the distributor, Silverlight Entertainment, chose to release it without this rating and with a self-anointed adults-only A rating.

On their TV show for the week of August 13–17, 1990, the late film critics Gene Siskel and Roger Ebert praised the decision to apply the A rating since it was a concept they had often discussed on At the Movies in the context of harshly criticizing the MPAA's standards of forcing serious films aimed at adult audiences to either undergo damaging edits to receive R ratings or be locked out of most theatrical and advertising outlets. While neither Roger nor Gene thought the movie was very good (they both gave it a thumbs-down verdict) they appreciated the director and studio taking this stand, and hoped it would someday lead to a viable ratings designation for films that were for adults but weren't pornographic.

References

External links

1989 films
Films directed by Wayne Wang
Films set in Hong Kong
Films set in the United States
Films set in China
Films set in the 1980s
American black comedy films
1980s black comedy films
1989 comedy films
1980s English-language films
1990s English-language films
1980s American films
1990s American films